The 1934 Ball State Cardinals football team was an American football team that represented Ball State Teachers College (later renamed Ball State University) in the Indiana Intercollegiate Conference (IIC) during the 1934 college football season. In its fifth and final season under head coach Lawrence McPhee, the team compiled a 2–6 record.

Schedule

References

Ball State
Ball State Cardinals football seasons
Ball State Cardinals football